Interpretation is a quarterly peer-reviewed academic journal that covers the field of biblical studies. The editor-in-chief is Samuel L. Adams (Union Presbyterian Seminary). It was established in 1947 and is published by SAGE Publications.

Abstracting and indexing 
The journal is abstracted and indexed in:
 Children's Book Review Index
 Guide to Social Science & Religion in Periodical Literature
 International Review of Biblical Studies
 New Testament Abstracts

External links 
 

Biblical studies journals
Publications established in 1947
Quarterly journals
English-language journals
SAGE Publishing academic journals
Hermeneutics